Dyce is a suburb of Aberdeen, Scotland.

Dyce may also refer to:
 Dyce station (Manitoba), a train station in Dyce, Manitoba, Canada
 Dyce Academy, a school in Dyce, Scotland
 Dyce railway station, Dyce, Scotland

People with the surname Dyce
 Alexander Dyce (1798–1869), Scottish dramatic editor and literary historian
 Charles Andrew Dyce (1816–1853), Singaporean artist
 Keith Dyce (1926–2014) Dean of the Dick Vet School in Edinburgh
 William Dyce (1806–1864), Scottish artist

See also
 Dice (disambiguation)